Tesla – Lightning in His Hand is a large-scale opera about Serbian American engineer and inventor Nikola Tesla (1856–1943), composed by Constantine Koukias, a Tasmanian composer and opera director of Greek ancestry based in Amsterdam, where he is known by his Greek name of Konstantin Koukias, with libretto by Marianne Fisher.

Plot

The opera depicts Tesla's life as a series of reversals of fortunes. The two-hour work, sung in English, is in two parts and features a bass, a tenor, a bass-baritone, two sopranos, seven musicians (including a theremin player) and a large male choir. Also audible are clattering typewriters, pigeons (in later life Tesla was deeply affected by the death of a specific white pigeon), Morse code and fragments of Antonín Dvořák's New World Symphony. It also included two Tesla coil as props at its premiere. A warning was issued in the program to audience members who might be wearing "pace-makers, hearing aides, or any form of electric, magnetic, mechanical or metallic implant or prosthetic device".

Production

The full opera was produced in 2003 by IHOS Music Theatre and Opera. It was originally commissioned by the West Australian Opera and developed over three years through two staged "works in development". Creator and original Artistic Director of Tasmania's 10 Days on the Island Festival, Robyn Archer, commissioned the full opera to open the festival in 2003. The work, sponsored by the John Holland Group, was staged in a massive shed on Hobart's docks, where the Tesla coils put on a "spectacular display of electron sparks".

Reception
Reviewing the production for the Melbourne Age, David Lander described it as "gorgeous image-based performance art with a fascinating, brittle score in which dilemmas are ignored in favour of sensuality". Tesla was featured on ABC Classic FM's New Music Australia program and has been cited as far afield as Croatia, where it was noted in a tourist board tribute to the scientist and Croatian Post's web page detailing a stamp to celebrate the 150th anniversary of the inventor's birth.

2003 production credits
Production director: Werner Ihlenfeld
Production designer: Maria Kunda
Artist in light: Hugh McSpedden

References

External links
Tasmanian Composers Collective listing for Constantine Koukias
IHOS Music Theatre and Opera Tesla web page

Operas
English-language operas
2003 operas
Works about Nikola Tesla
Operas by Constantine Koukias
Operas set in Europe
Operas set in the 19th century
Operas set in the 20th century
Operas based on real people